Cnergyico Pk Limited (formerly Byco Petroleum Pakistan Limited / Bosicor Pakistan Limited) is a Pakistani petroleum company which is a subsidiary of the Mauritian company Cnergyico Industries Incorporated. The company is vertically integrated across the oil refining and marketing industries, notable for being the only petroleum company in Pakistan to own and operate a crude oil terminal (Single Point Mooring). Cnergyico operates Pakistan’s biggest oil refinery in terms of nameplate capacity, the largest capacity crude oil storage tanks in the country, and a network of petrol pumps.

Company history 
Cnergyico was formed by the father-son-duo of Mr. Parvez Abbasi (Late) and the company’s current CEO Mr. Amir Abbassciy on January 9, 1995, and was granted a certificate of commencement of business on March 13, 1995. It was initially called Bosicor Pakistan Limited.   In 2001, Bosicor began construction of its first refinery (ORC-1) and began commercial production on July 1, 2004. The refining capacity was initially 18,000 barrels per day which was later increased to 36,000 barrels per day. 

The company opened its first petrol pump in June 2007 near Sukkur. A year later, the company began construction of 120,000 barrels per day oil refinery (ORC-II). In 2009, the company developed the largest capacity Storage Tanks in Pakistan. In early 2010, the company changed its name from Bosicor Pakistan Limited to Byco Petroleum Pakistan Limited.  Byco Petroleum started working on the Single Point Mooring and Pipeline network project in 2010 and the project was launched in 2012. The Single Point Mooring (SPM) oil terminal was deployed in the deep sea off the coast of Balochistan. This allowed Byco Petroleum to directly import crude oil for its oil refineries, without relying on other ports that frequently experience congestion and delivery delays. On December 2012, the first oil vessel, M.T ARIETIS, carrying 70,000 tons of crude oil, delivered its cargo to Byco Petroleum through the SPM. 

In 2012, the company’s second oil refinery (ORC-II) began commercial operations and was inaugurated by the then Prime Minister of Pakistan Ms. Benazir Bhutto. By 2017, both oil refineries became fully operational, making Byco Petroleum the largest oil refiner in Pakistan with a total installed capacity of 156,000 barrels per day. In the same year, the company opened its 300th petrol pump and the SPM achieved a milestone of handling 5 million metric tons of oil since its inception. In 2018, Byco Petroleum commissioned the Catalytic Reformer at ORC-II to produce higher octane fuels.  In 2021, Byco Petroleum started working on the Upgrade-1 project to expand and modernize its operations.  In late 2021, Byco Petroleum got renamed to Cnergyico Pk Limited. The word Cnergyico has been derived from Chemical Energy Integrated Company.

Company overview 
Cnergyico is based in Karachi, Pakistan. It works in oil refining, petroleum marketing, and petroleum logistics business in Pakistan. It is traded on the Pakistan Stock Exchange .

Cnergyico operates a network of more than 450 petrol pumps located in all the major cities, towns, and highways of Pakistan.  Upon completion of the acquisition of Puma Energy, Cnergyico will become the largest fuel retailer of Pakistan in the private sector with a retail network of approximately 1,000 petrol pumps. Whereas the State-owned Pakistan State Oil Co. has 3,500 petrol pumps, Total Parco Pakistan Ltd. has 800 petrol pumps and Shell Pakistan Ltd. has 766 petrol pumps.

Cnergyico owns and operates Pakistan's largest oil refining complex in terms of design capacity of 156,000 barrels per day. Cnergyico alone accounts for 37% of Pakistan's total oil refining capacity of approximately 420,000 barrels per day. The company's oil refining complex is located near the city of Hub in the Balochistan province.  The complex houses two oil refining units ORC-1 and ORC-II, crude oil and petroleum products storage facilities, and other related energy infrastructure assets.  Cnergyico also owns a petrochemical plant at the oil refining complex that can produce petrochemical products such as Benzene, Mixed Xylene, and Para Xylene. 

Cnergyico is the nation's only firm having a dedicated Single Point Mooring (SPM). Cnergyico's SPM the first and only liquid port in the country.  The SPM is Pakistan’s third terminal used for importing crude oil and liquid petroleum products, besides Karachi Port Trust (KPT) and Fauji Oil Terminal (Fotco). Cnergyico began working on the SPM project in 2010 and installed it in 2012 to avoid problems of congestion at KPT and Fotco. The SPM is situated in the deep sea, roughly 15 km away from Cnergyico’s oil refining complex. It connects with the onshore oil storage facilities through 11.5 km offshore and 3.3 km onshore 28-inch pipelines. Unlike other ports in Pakistan, the SPM can handle Very Large Crude Carriers (“VLCC”s) of up to 250,000 DWT. The SPM received Pakistan’s largest-ever shipment of crude oil of 102,000 metric tons in 2017. The SPM is Pakistan's only terminal having a tier 3 oil spill response membership.

Cnergyico actively supports the development of a coral reef around its subsea oil pipeline to enhance the region’s marine biodiversity. The coral reef situated between the SPM and Cnergyico’s oil refining complex is a rare marine habitat found in Pakistani waters. 

Cnergyico refines crude oil into various marketable components including Liquefied Petroleum Gas, Light Naphtha, Heavy Naphtha, High Octane Blending Component, Motor Gasoline, Kerosene, Jet Fuels, High Speed Diesel and Furnace Oil. Having operated as a low complexity refinery since inception, it is upgrading to produce more high value products, with reduced sulphur content, in diesel and convert  furnace oil into gasoline and diesel. Cnergyico's marketing network supports retail outlets in more than 100 cities all over Pakistan and is an emerging player. Cnergyico aims to become the first refinery in Pakistan by upgrading its facilities to ensure environmental compliance.

Acquisition 
Cnergyico Pk Ltd acquiring 57.37 per cent shares of Puma Energy Pakistan and has become the country’s second-largest fuel retailer.

Financial Performance 
Highlights of the Financial Year 2022 (twelve months ending June 2022)

·       The company’s revenues from contract with customers increased by 19.6% to PKR 170 billion (FY-2021: PKR 142 billion). 

·       The company’s gross profit increased by 35.3% to PKR 10.9 billion (FY-2021: PKR 8.1 billion). 

·       The company’s operating profit increased by 41.3% to PKR 8.9 billion (FY-2021: PKR 6.3 billion). 

·       The company’s profit before tax increased by 52.9% to PKR 5.92 billion (FY-2021: PKR 3.9 billion). 

·       The company’s profit after tax (net income) increased by 33.1% to PKR 4.79 billion (FY-2021: PKR 3.6 billion). 

·       The company’s earnings per share increased by 34.3% to Rs0.90 per share (FY-2021: Rs0.67 per share).

Products
 Liquid fuels
 Gasoline
 Jet fuel
 Ultra winterized diesel
 Furnace oil
 Compressed natural gas (CNG)
 Liquefied petroleum gas (LPG)
 Lubricants

References

External links
Official website

Oil and gas companies of Pakistan
Oil refineries in Karachi
Companies listed on the Pakistan Stock Exchange
Pakistani subsidiaries of foreign companies
Energy companies established in 1995
Automotive fuel retailers
Companies based in Karachi
Pakistani companies established in 1995